Boddepalli Rajagopala Rao (12 March 1923 – 22 February 1992) was an Indian politician.

Political history
Boddepalli Rajagopala Rao represented Srikakulam (Lok Sabha constituency) in Andhra Pradesh for six terms between 1952 and 1967 (1st, 2nd and 3rd Lok Sabha) and 1971 to 1984 (5th, 6th and 7th Lok Sabha). He was elected to the Indian Parliament for the first time as Independent candidate and later joined Indian National Congress.

He started the career from Panchayat level and reached the highest forum of democracy in India. He was director of Andhra Pradesh State Co-operative Bank, Hyderabad for 6 years.

Rajagopala Rao Boddepalli died on 22 February 1992 at Visakhapatnam at the age of 68 years.

In his career he had successfully completed his mission to add the kalinga caste from OC to BC as a result of which many people of that caste are able to get higher education and opportunities.

The Vamsadhara project built on Vamsadhara River in Srikakulam district has been named after Boddepalli Rajagopala Rao.

Personal life
His parents were Boddepalli Sitaramaswamy and Annapoorna and he was born at Akkulapeta, near Amadalavalasa in 1923. He was educated at Vizianagaram College and Pachaiyappa's College, Madras.

His wife's name is Seethamma and they have two sons and one daughter. His elder son is Chitty Babu who is a social worker, serving the poor people in the district and continued their family's political history in the State. Chitty Babu's wife Satyavathi is former MLA for Amadalavalasa. His younger son is Dr. B. Sitharama Swamy, a pediatrician.

References

External links
 Biodata of Boddepalli Rajagopala Rao at Lok Sabha website.

1923 births
1992 deaths
India MPs 1952–1957
India MPs 1957–1962
India MPs 1962–1967
India MPs 1971–1977
India MPs 1977–1979
India MPs 1980–1984
Indian National Congress politicians from Andhra Pradesh
Lok Sabha members from Andhra Pradesh
People from Srikakulam
People from Uttarandhra
Telugu politicians